Hawkley is a village and civil parish in the East Hampshire district of Hampshire, England. It is 3.5 miles (5.7 km) north of Petersfield, to the west of the A3 road.

Hawkley is situated in an area of outstanding natural beauty, sitting on the Hangers Way. Hawkley Warren, an important site for Red Helleborine, borders the village.

The village's St Peter and St Paul Church (with its Rhenish helm on its tower), and Hawkley Hurst house, were both designed by celebrated architect Samuel Sanders Teulon. The church is a listed building and there are 17 other listed buildings in the parish.

References

External links

 Historical information on GENUKI
 www.hawkley.org for the village website

Villages in Hampshire